The efferent vessels of the subclavicular group unite to form the subclavian trunk, which opens either directly into the junction of the internal jugular and subclavian veins or into the jugular lymphatic trunk; on the left side it may end in the thoracic duct.

References

External links
 http://anatomy.uams.edu/anatomyhtml/lymph_thorax.html

Lymphatics of the upper limb